Eugnosta molybdina is a species of moth of the family Tortricidae. It is found in Mexico (San Luis Potosí).

References

Moths described in 1968
Eugnosta